Above and Beyond is a 1952 American World War II film about Lt. Col. Paul W. Tibbets Jr., the pilot of the aircraft that dropped the atomic bomb on Hiroshima in August 1945.

Directed by Melvin Frank and Norman Panama, it stars Robert Taylor as Tibbets and features a love story with Eleanor Parker as his wife. James Whitmore plays security officer Major Bill Uanna. The story of the dropping of the atomic bomb is treated as a docudrama with an effort to recreate the training and operational aspects of the military units involved in the Hiroshima mission.

Plot
Col. Paul W. Tibbets Jr. (Robert Taylor) is assigned to a dangerous mission in testing a new bomber, the Boeing B-29 Superfortress. The perilous assignment has caused his wife Lucy (Eleanor Parker) to worry for his life and whether their marriage can survive the constant separations.

After a year of scrutiny, Maj. Gen. Vernon C. Brent (Larry Keating) who championed Tibbets as a test pilot, selects him to lead a new unit in the Pacific war, flying the B-29, armed with a new secret weapon. Scientists of the "Manhattan Project" explain what is "the best-kept secret of the war," the atomic bomb. Along with Maj. Bill Uanna (James Whitmore), the only other person who knows what the mission will entail, Tibbets is expected to keep strict discipline over the personnel assigned to a B-29 conversion unit at Wendover Field, Utah.

When families of crew members are brought to Wendover, tensions erupt in the Tibbets family due to Lucy's attitude towards her husband's secrecy concerning the mission, as the decision to use the atomic bomb has been made. Flying out to the Pacific island base of Tinian, the B-29 designated for the Hiroshima bombing is named the Enola Gay.  Although the mission is a success, as he wrests the aircraft around to escape the aftershock, the realization of the devastation is brought home as Tibbets sees the flash of the bomb and the subsequent atomic blast.  Back on Tinian, the crew is mobbed and although a second mission is mounted, the war has been decided by the actions of the B-29 bombers. Tibbets finally returns home, flying first to Washington where he has a joyous reunion with his wife.

Cast
 Robert Taylor as ColonelPaul W. Tibbets, 509th Composite Group Commanding Officer and pilot of the Enola Gay
 Eleanor Parker as Lucy Tibbets
 James Whitmore as Major Bill Uanna (Security Officer, Operation Silverplate)
 Larry Keating as Major General Vernon C. Brent (fictional stand-in for Major General Uzal Girard Ent)
 Larry Gates as Captain William "Deak"' Parsons, USN
 Marilyn Erskine as Marge Bratton
 Stephen Dunne as Major Harry Bratton, (fictional) co-pilot during B-29 tests
 Robert Burton as Brigadier General Samuel E. Roberts (Tibbets' fictional CO in Africa)
 Hayden Rorke as Dr. Norman Ramsey
 Lawrence Dobkin as Dr. Van Dyke (as Larry Dobkin)
 Jim Backus as Major General Curtis E. LeMay
 Christopher Olsen as Paul Tibbets Jr. (son) (as Christie Olsen)
 Sidney and Ernest Sittig as Baby Tibbets (son)

Production
The film was suggested by screenwriter Beirne Lay Jr., a Colonel in the Air Force Reserve, to General Curtis LeMay, then commander of the Strategic Air Command (SAC), who had discussed with Lay the problem of the high rate of divorce among flight crews. A film depicting the problems might help raise morale.

Lay suggested a film based on the experiences of Colonel Paul Tibbets, commander of the 509th Composite Group during World War II. LeMay approved, and after writing an outline, Lay handed over scriptwriting duties to Melvin Frank and Norman Panama. Although Tibbets gave his full approval and support to the film, he felt he was too closely involved to be objective, and suggested Lt. Col. Charles F.H. Begg, commander of the nuclear ordnance squadron, and Charles Sweeney, pilot on the follow-up Nagasaki mission, as technical advisors. Ultimately, Begg, Major Norman W. Ray (ret'd.) and Major James B. Bean served as USAF technical advisors.

Dore Schary of MGM said "It wasn't the yarn that intrigued me but the people and their problems in it."

It was originally called Eagle on His Cap.

Principal photography began on February 5, 1952, at the Culver City studios before transferring to Davis–Monthan Air Force Base that was predominantly utilized for the airfield scenes of Wendover Air Force Base, Boeing's Wichita testing area and even Tinian Island. The production wound up on March 26, 1952. For dramatic effect, some incidents were somewhat exaggerated, such as the scene in which the Hiroshima bomb is armed in mid-flight. The filmmakers added some turbulence to increase tension, although in fact the flight was perfectly smooth throughout. In addition, the entire mission was filmed in daylight, although actual takeoff from Tinian was in full darkness at 2:45 in the morning. However, the scene in which Tibbet's wife calls over one of the men in white coats that she was told by her husband were "sanitary engineers", but were in fact nuclear scientists from Los Alamos, to help her repair a drain, was true.

Promotion
When initial reviews came in, Taylor's performance in Above and Beyond was considered the "finest performance of his career to date". Taylor was also proud of his accomplishments in the film and urged MGM to allow him to promote the film on television. Taylor and Tibbets appeared together on Ed Sullivan's Toast of the Town show in order to promote the film, an unusual step at a time when the major Hollywood studios disapproved of its stars appearing on television, which they saw as a threat. Although the studio was hesitant about the television appearance, the publicity gained was important to the film's initial success.

Reception
Above and Beyond received generally favorable reviews. The New York Times critic Bosley Crowther found the military elements of the film superior to its focus on the relationship between Tibbets and his wife. He liked Taylor in the military scenes, but not in the scenes concerning his  marriage and found Parker to be "utterly theatrical." Reviewer Robert Parish considered the film a comprehensive if lengthy account that was a "too meticulous detail-by-detail presentation," and considered Parker's performance "overwrought". Although considered an aviation classic due to its subject matter focusing on the mission of the "Enola Gay", aviation film historians considered the flying sequences to be limited, and that the romance scenes "got in the way".

Above and Beyond was named one of the year's 10 best films by the National Board of Review, and celebrity and film columnist Louella Parsons, chose it as the "Best Drama of the Month" in Cosmopolitan. Leonard Maltin considered the film, "a meaningful account" of an important event. A more tepid later review by Alun Evans, noted the film was "pretty boring fare, but the right kind of Hollywood fodder for the days of McCarthy and Stalin".

Box office
According to MGM records, the film earned $2,647,000 in the US and Canada and $1,333,000 overseas, resulting in a profit of $1,037,000.

Awards
Above and Beyond was nominated for two Academy Awards: Best Original Motion Picture Story for Beirne Lay Jr. and Best Scoring of a Dramatic Picture for Hugo Friedhofer.

References

Notes

Citations

Bibliography

 Evans, Alun. Brassey's Guide to War Films. Dulles, Virginia: Potomac Books, 2000. .
 Hardwick, Jack and Ed Schnepf. "A Viewer's Guide to Aviation Movies". The Making of the Great Aviation Films, General Aviation Series, Volume 2, 1989.
 Maltin, Leonard. Leonard Maltin's Movie Guide 2009. New York: New American Library, 2009 (originally published as TV Movies, then Leonard Maltin’s Movie & Video Guide), First edition 1969, published annually since 1988. .
 Orriss, Bruce. When Hollywood Ruled the Skies: The Aviation Film Classics of World War II. Hawthorne, California: Aero Associates Inc., 1984. .
 Parish, James Robert. The Great Combat Pictures: Twentieth-Century Warfare on the Screen. Metuchen, New Jersey: The Scarecrow Press, 1990. .
 Tibbets, Paul W. Mission: Hiroshima. New York: Stein & Day, 1985. .
 Tibbets, Paul Warfield, Clair C. Stebbins and Harry Franken. The Tibbets Story. New York: Stein & Day, 1982. .
 Wayne, Jane Ellen. Robert Taylor. New York: Manor Books Inc., 1973. .

External links
 DVD review
  
 
 
 
 About the RCA811-K radio that gives Mrs. Tibbets the news about Hiroshima

1952 films
1950s biographical drama films
1950s war drama films
American aviation films
American biographical drama films
American black-and-white films
American war drama films
Biographical films about military personnel
1950s English-language films
Films about the atomic bombings of Hiroshima and Nagasaki
Films directed by Melvin Frank
Films directed by Norman Panama
Films scored by Hugo Friedhofer
Metro-Goldwyn-Mayer films
Science docudramas
Films about the United States Air Force
World War II aviation films
1952 drama films
Japan in non-Japanese culture
American docudrama films
1950s American films